Spermacoce verticillata, the shrubby false buttonweed, is a species of plant in the family Rubiaceae.

See also
''Larra bicolor

References

verticillata